The Secret Life of Couples is a Brazilian drama television series created by Bruna Lombardi and directed by Kim Riccelli and Carlos Alberto Riccelli. It was produced by HBO Latin America in partnership with Pulsar and Coração da Selva.

Premise
The sexologist Sofia (Bruna Lombardi) sees her life upside down after a relationship with a patient puts her in the sights of an investigation. Now she's going to have to defend her secrets from the attacks she will receive from all sides, while a mystery attracts her suspicions. Little by little she will see the appearances of interpersonal relations and private powers in the city of São Paulo.

Cast and characters

Special participation

Release

Broadcast
The Secret Life of Couples began airing on 1 October 2017 on HBO Brasil and HBO Latin America.

References

External links

2017 Brazilian television series debuts
2010s Brazilian television series
Brazilian drama television series
Portuguese-language television shows
HBO Latin America original programming
Television shows set in São Paulo
Portuguese-language HBO original programming